Weilerbach is a small town in the commune of Berdorf, in eastern Luxembourg.  , the town has a population of 267.

Echternach (canton)
Towns in Luxembourg